Trevor Blake is a British entrepreneur and author.

Early life and education
Blake is a graduate of Britannia Royal Naval College and earned an MBA from Durham University.

Career
With a degree in radiation physics and nuclear medicine, Blake worked as a therapeutic radiographer in a cancer treatment hospital in the UK. 
Blake started his first company with a few thousand dollars and later sold it for more than $100 million. Blake founded a virtually-structured company focused on developing cancer treatments, of which he sold a majority stake in 2011 to create the joint venture, Neovia Oncology Ltd.

Published works
In 2012 Blake published Three Simple Steps: A Map to Success in Business and Life.

In 2018, Blake published Secrets of a Successful Startup.

References

External links 
 Official page

British writers
Living people
Year of birth missing (living people)
Alumni of Durham University